Pediatric Dermatology is a peer-reviewed medical journal provide relevant and educational material for practising clinicians and dermatological researchers, focused on hemangiomas, atopic dermatitis, neonatal medicine etc. The journal is published by Wiley.

Abstracting and indexing 
The journal is abstracted and indexed in:

 Abstracts in Anthropology (Sage)
 Abstracts on Hygiene & Communicable Diseases (CABI)
 Academic Search (EBSCO Publishing)
 Academic Search Alumni Edition (EBSCO Publishing)
 Academic Search Premier (EBSCO Publishing)
 AgBiotech News & Information (CABI)
 AgBiotechNet (CABI)

According to the Journal Citation Reports, the journal has a 2020 impact factor of 1.997.

References

External links 

 

English-language journals
Dermatology journals